Kevin Baker (born June 15, 1979) is a Canadian former professional ice hockey player who last played for the Quad City Mallards of the ECHL. He was selected by the Los Angeles Kings in the 7th round (193rd overall) of the 1999 NHL Entry Draft.

Career
Baker played in the juniors for a season with the Trenton Sting of the OPJHL and three seasons with the Belleville Bulls of the OHL. In 2000, he turned professional with the Lowell Lock Monsters of the AHL. 2001–02 saw him moving between the AHL and the ECHL. Between 2002 and 2006, he attended Acadia University, where he played 3 seasons (in 2002–03, he sat out the mandatory season after turning professional). Since college, he has bounced between various leagues, spending more time in the ECHL and AHL, and 2 seasons in Europe, one in Germany playing for the Schwenninger Wild Wings of the 2. Bundesliga and one in Italy playing for Ritten Sport of the Serie A.

On July 1, 2014, he re-signed for a second full season with the Arizona Sundogs of the Central Hockey League. However, with the Sundogs folding and the discontinuance of the CHL, Baker signed with the Quad City Mallards of the ECHL.

Career statistics

Awards and honours

References

External links

1979 births
Acadia University alumni
Albany River Rats players
Arizona Sundogs players
Belleville Bulls players
Canadian ice hockey left wingers
Evansville IceMen players
Florida Everblades players
Ice hockey people from Ontario
Johnstown Chiefs players
Living people
Los Angeles Kings draft picks
Lowell Lock Monsters players
Milwaukee Admirals players
Orlando Solar Bears (ECHL) players
Quad City Mallards (ECHL) players
Rochester Americans players
Saint John Flames players
Schwenningen ERC players
Schwenninger Wild Wings players
Sportspeople from Kingston, Ontario
Stockton Thunder players
Texas Wildcatters players
Toronto Marlies players
Canadian expatriate ice hockey players in Germany
Canadian expatriate ice hockey players in the United States